The House of Sleeus or Sleeus Lineage (French: Lignage Sleeus) is one of the Seven Noble Houses of Brussels along with the Houses of: Roodenbeke, Serhuyghs, Steenweeghs, Sweerts, Serroelofs, and Coudenberg.

The Sleeus House was charged with the defence of the Laeken gate, seconded as of 1422 by the nation of Notre-Dame.

Escutcheon 
 Gules that is Brussels, a lion rampant argent.

The Seven Noble Houses of Brussels 

The Seven noble houses of Brussels were the seven families of Brussels whose descendants formed the patrician class of that city, and to whom special privileges in the government of that city were granted until the end of the Ancien Régime.

Together with the Guilds of Brussels they formed the Bourgeoisie of the city.

Engraving

Authority 
Content in this edit is translated from the existing French Wikipedia article at :fr:Lignage Sleeus; see its history for attribution.

See also 

 Seven Noble Houses of Brussels
House of Serroelofs
House of Sweerts
House of Coudenbergh
House of Roodenbeke
House of Serhuyghs
House of Steenweeghs
 Bourgeois of Brussels
 Guilds of Brussels

References 

 
Belgian families
People from Brussels-Capital Region